Invasion of Java may refer to:

Mongol invasion of Java (1293)
British invasion of Java (1811)
Japanese invasion of Java (1942)